The Jonica is a breed of domestic goat from the province of Taranto, in Puglia in southern Italy. The origins of the breed are uncertain; it is thought to have originated from crossing of local varieties with the Maltese breed. The Jonica is one of the eight autochthonous Italian goat breeds for which a genealogical herdbook is kept by the Associazione Nazionale della Pastorizia, the Italian national association of sheep-breeders.

At the end of 2013 the registered population was 232.

Use

The annual milk yield of the Jonica goat is 350–400 litres.

References

Goat breeds
Dairy goat breeds
Province of Taranto
Goat breeds originating in Italy